Saint-Nazaire-le-Désert is a commune in the Drôme department in the Auvergne-Rhône-Alpes region in southeastern France.

History
Archaeology suggests that people have settled in the area for over six thousand years. Fragments of Iron Age vases for roasting wheat have been found in the area. There is also a ruined castle, sacred architecture and a sixteenth-century church on water.

Population

Economy
The French goat's cheese Picodon is made in and around the area of Saint-Nazaire-le-Désert. Lavender is grown locally and products containing lavender are popular.

See also
Communes of the Drôme department

References

Communes of Drôme